An aviator hat, also known as a bomber hat, is a usually a leather cap with large earflaps, a chin strap, and often a short bill that is commonly turned up at the front to show the lining (often fleece or fur). It is often worn with goggles. It may be made of other materials, such as felt.

Aviator hats became popular in the early days of the 20th century as open-cockpit airplanes grew in use. Pilots needed a hat to keep their heads and ears warm, as well as goggles to protect their eyes in flight. With the advent of closed-cockpit airplanes, hats became less necessary (Charles Lindbergh still wore one when he crossed the Atlantic in 1927, though his Spirit of St. Louis monoplane had a closed cockpit). Nonetheless, aviator's hats continued in popularity as a fashion accessory and winter hat. Aviator's hats continued in aviation use through the Second World War, until the age of jet fighters, when solid plastic and, later, carbon fiber helmets replaced leather caps in the cockpits of planes.

External links

Hats
Aircrew clothing
Air force uniforms